Burgwedel is a town in the district of Hanover, in Lower Saxony, Germany. It is situated approximately 15 km northeast of Hanover. It has a population of around 20,200.

Politics and Administration
Burgwedel consists of the following boroughs:

 Engensen
 Fuhrberg
 Großburgwedel (administrative seat)
 Kleinburgwedel
 Oldhorst
 Thönse
 Wettmar

Religion

Protestant (Evangelical-Lutheran) Church

Roman Catholic Church
The members of the Roman Catholic St. Paul's parish community Burgwedel make up the second largest religious community of the town. St. Paul's belongs to the diocese of Hildesheim, which is part of the ecclesiastical province of Hamburg.

Further Christian Communities

Education and Culture

Schools

Libraries

Economics

Companies
The headquarter of Rossmann, a major drugstore chain, is located in Burgwedel.

Personalities

Sons and daughters of the town

 Carl Graf von Alten (1764-1840), Hanoverian-British general and statesman
 Otto Wöhler (1894-1987), General of the Wehrmacht and war criminal
 Valmir Sulejmani (born 1996), German footballer

Notable residents
 Karsten Friedrich Hoppenstedt, (b 1937), Member of the European Parliament
 Willi Reimann, (b 1949), former footballer and football coach
 Gundis Zámbó, (b 1966), actress
 Mike Hanke, (b 1983), footballer
 Christian Wulff, (b 1959), politician (CDU), former Federal President, former Lower Saxony Minister President
 Bettina Wulff, (b 1973), wife of Christian Wulff
 Gerald Asamoah, (b 1978), footballer
 Dieter Schatzschneider, (b 1958), soccer player
 Hermann Bahlsen, (1927-2014), bakery factory manufacturer

References

Hanover Region